The Hawassa Industrial Park (HIP) is an eco-industrial park in Hawassa, Sidama Region, Ethiopia. Inaugurated on 13 July 2016, the park is a flagship of the Ethiopian government responsible for garment, apparel and textile manufacturing. The industrial park created 130 hectares of land with potential development up to 400 hectares of land in the first phase. Compared to Bole Lemi Industrial Park (32 million dollars), HIP created 20 million dollars exports, showing the highest capacity in the first nine years.

Overview
Inaugurated on 13 July 2016, Hawassa Industrial Park is a flagship that is funded and developed by the Ethiopian government specialized at textile and garment industry. Marking the opening ceremony, Prime Minister Hailemariam Desalegn said that this industrial park is the "foundation for Ethiopia's ambition to become the leading manufacturing in Africa". The industrial park is an eco-industrial park registered 22 firms compared with Bole Lemi Industrial Park with 10 firms in the Eastern Industry Zone.

Hawassa Industrial Park in its first phase, built about 130 hectares of land with potential development up to 400 hectares of land. This industrial park has zero liquid discharge (ZLD) facility for garment, apparel and textile company to fully engage export only. Totally, the park covers 37 sheds (22 sheds of 11,000 m2, 12 sheds of 5,500 m2 and other 3 specialize sheds). The first phase able to create a job about 20,000 people, having to accept 60,000 people if fully completed according to the Ethiopian Investment Commission. 

In 2017–2018, Bole Lemi Industrial Park showed 32 million dollars, Hawassa with 20 million dollars and Eastern Industrial Park 14 million dollars, with Hawassa had large capacity of exports in the first nine years. As of March 2019, Hawassa has created the largest number of jobs, up to 24,000 people. The industrial park envisaged identifying, selecting, grade and training about 30,000 employees in the next two years.

References

Industrial parks in Ethiopia
Sidama Region